Dracula sergioi is an epiphytic species of orchid in the genus Dracula.
Most dracula orchids grow in Antioquia, Colombia at elevations around 1950 meters.

sergioi